Ceres School is a historic two-room school building located at Ceres in Allegany County, New York.  It was built in 1855 and remodeled in 1893 with Italianate and Queen Anne style design elements.  It is a one-story, gross-gabled frame building topped by a belfry. It is a surviving example of a late 19th-century schoolhouse, which served students from both Pennsylvania and New York. The school closed following World War II and used as a community center.

It was listed on the National Register of Historic Places in 2010.

References

School buildings on the National Register of Historic Places in New York (state)
Italianate architecture in New York (state)
Queen Anne architecture in New York (state)
School buildings completed in 1855
Buildings and structures in Allegany County, New York
National Register of Historic Places in Allegany County, New York
1855 establishments in New York (state)